Abbas Attar (full name:  ʿAbbās ʿAṭṭār; 29 March 1944 – 25 April 2018), better known by his mononym Abbas, was an Iranian photographer known for his photojournalism in Biafra, Vietnam and  South Africa in the 1970s, and for his extensive essays on religions in later years. He was a member of Sipa Press from 1971 to 1973, a member of Gamma from 1974 to 1980, and joined Magnum Photos in 1981.

Career
Attar, an Iranian transplanted to Paris, dedicated his photographic work to the political and social coverage of the developing southern nations. Since 1970, his major works have been published in world magazines and include wars and revolutions in Biafra, Bangladesh, Ulster, Vietnam, the Middle East, Chile, Cuba, and South Africa with an essay on apartheid.

From 1978 to 1980, he photographed the revolution in Iran, and returned in 1997 after a 17-year voluntary exile. His book iranDiary 1971–2002 (2002) is a critical interpretation of its history, photographed and written as a personal diary.

From 1983 to 1986, he travelled throughout Mexico, photographing the country as if he were writing a novel. An exhibition and a book, Return to Mexico, journeys beyond the mask (1992), which includes his travel diaries, helped him define his aesthetics in photography.

From 1987 to 1994, he photographed the resurgence of Islam from the Xinjiang to Morocco. His book and exhibition Allah O Akbar, a journey through militant Islam (1994) exposes the internal tensions within Muslim societies, torn between a mythical past and a desire for modernization and democracy. The book drew additional attention after the September 11 attacks in 2001.

When the year 2000 became a landmark in the universal calendar, Christianity was the symbol of the strength of Western civilization. Faces of Christianity, a photographic journey (2000) and a touring exhibit, explored this religion as a political, a ritual and a spiritual phenomenon.

From 2000 to 2002 he worked on Animism. In our world defined by science and technology, the work looked at why irrational rituals make a strong come-back. He abandoned this project on the first anniversary of the September 11 attacks.

His book, In Whose Name? The Islamic World after 9/11 (2009), is a seven-year quest within 16 countries : opposed by governments who hunt them mercilessly, the jihadists lose many battles, but are they not winning the war to control the mind of the people, with the "creeping islamisation" of all Muslim societies?

From 2008 to 2010 Abbas travelled the world of Buddhism, photographing with the same sceptical eye for his book Les Enfants du lotus, voyage chez les bouddhistes (2011). In 2011, he began a similar long-term project on Hinduism which he concluded in 2013.

Before his death, Abbas was working on documenting Judaism around the world.

Filming for Abbas by Abbas (2020) by director Kamy Pakdel (who also served as art director for some of Abbas' books) was completed days before Abbas' death. In the film Abbas is asked how he got a particular shot and he replies “Let the photos live their lives and keep their mystery.”

He died in Paris on 25 April 2018, aged 74.

About his photography Abbas wrote:
My photography is a reflection, which comes to life in action and leads to meditation. Spontaneity – the suspended moment – intervenes during action, in the viewfinder. A reflection on the subject precedes it. A meditation on finality follows it, and it is here, during this exalting and fragile moment, that the real photographic writing develops, sequencing the images. For this reason a writer's spirit is necessary to this enterprise. Isn't photography "writing with light"? But with the difference that while the writer possesses his word, the photographer is himself possessed by his photo, by the limit of the real which he must transcend so as not to become its prisoner.

Books 

 Iran, la révolution confisquée, Clétrat, Paris, 1980
 Retornos a Oapan, FCE Rio de Luz, Mexico, 1986
 Return to Mexico, W. W. Norton, New York, 1992
 Allah O Akbar, voyages dans l’Islam militant, Phaidon, London, 1994
 Allah O Akbar, a journey through militant Islam, Phaidon, London, 1994
 Viaggio negli Islam del Mondo, Contrasto, Roma, 2002
 Voyage en chrétientés, La Martiniere, Paris, 2000
 Faces of Christianity, A. Abrams, New York, 2000
 Glaube-liebe-hoffnung, Knesebeck, Munchen, 2000
 IranDiary 1971–2002, Autrement, Paris, 2002
 IranDiario 1971–2005, Sagiattore, Milano, 2006
 Abbas, I Grandi Fotografi di Magnum, Hachette, Milan, 2005
 Sur la Route des Esprits, Delpire, Paris, 2005
 The children of Abraham, (exhibition catalogue), Intervalles, Paris, 2006
 In Whose Name?, Thames & Hudson, London, 2009
 Ali, le Combat, Sonatines, Paris, 2011
 Les Enfants du lotus, voyage chez les bouddhistes, De la Martinière, Paris, 2011

Exhibitions 

1972: Ganvie People, Falomo, Nigeria
1977: Retrospective, Galerie Litho, Tehran; Ce jour là, Galerie FNAC, Paris
1977: Le reportage d'agence, Rencontres de la Photographie, Arles, France
1980: Iran, the revolution, Tehran Museum of Contemporary Art; Darvazeh Ghar mosque, Tehran; Fundacao Cultural, Rio de Janeiro
1982: Citizen of the Third World, The Photographers' Gallery, London; Open Eye Gallery, Liverpool, G.B.
1983: Retrospective, Consejo de Fotogragia, Mexico; Galerie ARPA, Bordeaux, France, 1983; Imagina, Almeria, Espana, 1991
1986: Votez pour Moi, Magnum Gallery, Paris
1992: Return to Mexico, Mexico Cultural Center, Paris; Maison pour Tous, Calais; Centro Nacional de la Fotografia, Mexico, 1994
1999: Islamies, Place Royale, Brussels; Islamies, Arab World Institute, Paris, 1999
1999: Christians, Moscow House of Photography, Moscow; Eberhardskirche, Stuttgart, 1999; Centre cultural français, Seoul, Korea, 1999
2002: Iran, the revolution, The Grey Gallery, New York
2002: Viaggio negli Islam del mondo, Palazzo Vecchio, Firenze, Italia
2002: Visiones de l’Islam, La Caixa, Tarragona, Madrid, Malaga, Orense, Espana
2002: IranDiary, Visa pour l'Image, Perpignan, France
2003: Visiones de l’Islam, La Caixa, Girona, Granada, Pamplona and Palma de Mallorca, Espana
2004: Iran, Haus der Kulturen der Welt, Berlin
2004: Resurgence of Shias, Visa pour l'Image, Perpignan, France
2004: Ya Saddam, Noorderlicht, Leeuwarden, Hollande
2004: Islams, United Nations, New York
2005: Sur la Route des Esprits, La Chambre Claire, Paris
2006: The Children of Abraham, Nobel Peace Center, Oslo
2006: Islams and Shias, Vicino/Lontano, Udine, Italia
2007: The Children of Abraham, Groningen and Amsterdam, Holland; Institut Français de Fès, Morocco, 2008
2008: Jardin Botanique, Brussels, Belgium
2009: In Whose Name?, Magnum Gallery, Paris
2009: Visa pour l'Image, Perpignan, France
2009: Gallerie Polka, Paris
2011: Abbas, 45 Years in Photography, National Museum of Singapore
2014: Faces of Christianity, Photography Festival, Guernsey

See also
 Culture of Iran
 Islamic art
 Iranian art
 List of Iranian artists

References 

 Jeffrey, Ian et al. (1997). The Photography Book. London:Phaidon Press Limited.

External links
Photographs by Abbas at Magnum Photos
Abbas tribute at Magnum Photos
Abbas Attar at famousphotographers.net
Documentary film Abbas by Abbas

1944 births
2018 deaths
Iranian photographers
Magnum photographers
Photography in Vietnam
Iranian photojournalists
People from Sistan and Baluchistan Province